Bülent Bal (born 5 August 1977) is a Turkish professional footballer who currently plays as a centre back for Nilüfer Erdemli Sportif.

References

External links

1977 births
Living people
Turkish footballers
Gaziantepspor footballers
Gaziantep F.K. footballers
Bursaspor footballers
Elazığspor footballers
Dardanelspor footballers
Eskişehirspor footballers
Diyarbakırspor footballers
Kardemir Karabükspor footballers
Süper Lig players
Sportspeople from Bursa
Association football defenders